Alfred Agbesi Woyome (born January 22, 1965) is a Ghanaian businessman and a former Honorary Vice Consul of Austria to Ghana and a leading member of the National Democratic Congress.

Education 
Woyome is an alumnus of Bishop Herman College in Kpando in the Volta Region of Ghana where he had his secondary education.

See also 
Martin Amidu
Betty Mould-Iddrisu

References 

1965 births
Living people
Ghanaian businesspeople
Bishop Herman College alumni